Ah! My Goddess is an anime television series directed by Hiroaki Gōda, animated by Anime International Company, and produced by Tokyo Broadcasting System (TBS). Composed by Himaguchi Shiro, the music was produced by Half H•P Studio with Iwanami Miwa as music director. The series was coordinated by both Hiroaki Gōda and You Watanabe, with Matsubara Hidenori as character designer. The series is based on the manga series Oh My Goddess! by Kōsuke Fujishima, using material from the first 20 volumes of the series over 24 episodes. The series focuses on Keiichi Morisato, a college student who accidentally summons a goddess, Belldandy, and wishes for her to remain with him forever.
The season began broadcasting in Japan on TBS on January 7, 2005, and ended its run on July 8, 2005. Bandai Visual released the episodes in Japan between April 22, 2005, and November 25, 2005, as eight DVD compilations each containing three episodes. The two original video animations (OVAs), which had not been broadcast, were released on a special DVD on December 23, 2005. In Region 1, the anime was licensed to Media Blasters. Six DVD compilations, containing all twenty-six episodes, were released by Media Blasters from September 27, 2005, and July 11, 2006. Each DVD contained four episodes, excluding the first two, which contained five each. A premium complete season box set was released on November 7, 2006; the regular set followed on November 27, 2007. MVM Films distributed the series in the United Kingdom, with the individual volumes released between February 5, 2007, and December 3, 2007, in six similar DVD compilations. The box set followed on July 7, 2008. Madman Entertainment distributed the series in Australia, with the six individual volumes released between July 26, 2006, and December 6, 2006. The DVD collection containing all 26 episodes was released on October 10, 2007.

Three pieces of theme music were used throughout the series. The opening theme, titled , was performed by Yoko Ishida. Ishida also sang the first ending theme, used for the first 12 episodes, the special episode and episode 24. The second ending theme, used for the remainder of the series except episode 24, is "Wing" performed by Yoko Takahashi.

Episode list

Volume DVDs

Japanese release
Bandai Visual released the episodes in Japan between April 22, 2005, and November 25, 2005, as eight DVD compilations each containing three episodes. The two original video animations (OVAs), which had not been broadcast, were released on a special DVD on December 23, 2005.

North American release
In Region 1, the anime was licensed to Media Blasters, which released six DVD compilations, containing all twenty-six episodes, between September 27, 2005, and July 11, 2006. A premium complete season box set was released on November 7, 2006; the regular set followed on November 27, 2007.

United Kingdom release
MVM Entertainment distributed the series in the United Kingdom, with the individual volumes released between February 5, 2007, and December 3, 2007, in six similar DVD compilations. The box set followed on July 7, 2008.

Australasia release
Madman Entertainment distributed the series in Australasia, with the six individual volumes released between July 26, 2006, and December 6, 2006. The DVD collection containing all 26 episodes was released on October 10, 2007.

Notes
A.  Episode 12.5 was not included in the English DVD releases and it consequently has no official U.S. title. In addition, the episode is not officially numbered but had aired between episodes 12 and 13. The title translates loosely to "Ah! An Exchange Diary with the Goddess?"

References

2005 Japanese television seasons
Oh My Goddess!
Season 1